Tanya Moodie (born 16 April 1972) is a Canadian-born British actress and producer, best known for her work on Motherland, The Clinic, and her many stage credits, which include productions with the Royal Shakespeare Company, the Royal Court Theatre, the National Theatre and the Théâtre des Bouffes du Nord.

Early life and education
Tanya Moodie was born on 16 April 1972 in Quebec, Canada, to Jamaican parents. She moved to England at the age of 17, when she was offered a place at RADA, where she was later employed as an associate teacher and council member.

Career 
Moodie's first television role was in the comedy So Haunt Me in 1994,  followed by a starring role as Hunter in Neil Gaiman's 1996 fantasy mini-series Neverwhere (1996). She featured in guest roles in various series in the 2000s, and in 2008–9 had a regular role in Irish medical drama The Clinic. She also played the role of John Watson's therapist Ella Thompson in Sherlock

In 2016 she played Gertrude in Simon Godwin's production of Hamlet for the Royal Shakespeare Company.

From 2019, Moodie starred as Meg in the BBC comedy series Motherland. In a 2021 interview with the Huffington Post, Moody shared that she was proud of the feedback she had received about her character's cancer storyline: "There’s been people who have written me very personal messages saying that they’re going through [cancer] right now or their parents are, and they say we’ve really shown what it’s like. I’m really happy that that’s happened – I didn’t expect it to. I didn’t finish filming and say ‘I really feel like I’ve nailed what it’s like to go through this journey’, because it’s so subjective and unique to people."

In 2020, Moodie starred in the third series of Tin Star as Catherine Mckenzie. The series was created by Rowan Joffé.

In April 2022, Moodie featured as Regina in series 1 episode 4 of Ten Percent.

Moodie appeared in Sam Mendes' film Empire of Light, released in the US in December 2022, and the UK in January 2023. Moodie appears alongside Olivia Colman, Colin Firth and Micheal Ward.

In December 2022, Moodie reprised her role as Meg in the Christmas special of Motherland, titled "Last Christmas". The episode garnered wholly positive reviews from critics.

Personal life
Moodie has one child, a daughter, and was married to a yoga teacher before they separated. Her brother Andrew Moodie is a noted Canadian playwright.

Moodie is an art lover, collecting works by Abe Obedina.

Politically, Moodie is a supporter of the Women's Equality Party. She has practised yoga and Buddhism since 1994, and claimed in an interview in 2021, "cut me in half, you’ll see Buddhism down the middle".

Moodie is an ambassador for the Park Theatre, London.

Awards and nominations
Moodie was nominated for a 2017 UK Theatre Award for Best Performance for her performance as Wiletta in Trouble in Mind by Alice Childress. Other nominations include Best Actress at the London Evening Standard Theatre Awards, as well as an Olivier Award for Outstanding Achievement in an Affiliate Theatre for her performance as Esther in Intimate Apparel at the Park Theatre. In the same year she was nominated for an Olivier for Outstanding Achievement in an Affiliate Theatre for her performance as Makeda in The House That Will Not Stand at the Tricycle Theatre. Her portrayal of Rose in August Wilson's Fences opposite Lenny Henry in the West End earned her a nomination for Best Actress in the 2014 What's On Stage Awards. 

At the 2020 Royal Television Society Programme Awards, Moodie was presented with the Breakthrough Award for her role in Motherland.

Filmography

Film

Television

References

External links

1972 births
Living people
Actresses from Ottawa
British film actresses
British stage actresses
British television actresses
Canadian film actresses
Canadian stage actresses
Canadian television actresses
Black British actresses
Black Canadian actresses
Canadian emigrants to England
Canadian expatriates in England
Alumni of RADA
Women's Equality Party people
20th-century British actresses
21st-century British actresses
20th-century Canadian actresses
21st-century Canadian actresses